Juan Aguilar (15 May 1943 – 16 January 2015) was an Argentine boxer. He competed in the 1964 Summer Olympics.

References

1943 births
2015 deaths
Boxers at the 1964 Summer Olympics
Argentine male boxers
Olympic boxers of Argentina
Sportspeople from Mendoza, Argentina
Middleweight boxers